The Boulders, also known as the Homer A. Norris House, is a historic home located at Greenwood Lake in Orange County, New York. It was designed by architect Grosvenor Atterbury and built in 1911.  It is a two-story, rectangular stone bungalow dwelling and features a projecting two-story gable-roofed bay.

It was listed on the National Register of Historic Places in 2001.

References

Houses on the National Register of Historic Places in New York (state)
Houses completed in 1911
Bungalow architecture in New York (state)
Houses in Orange County, New York
National Register of Historic Places in Orange County, New York